Bowman-Haley Dam is an embankment dam located in Bowman County, North Dakota, in the southwestern part of the state. The dam is just over 2 miles north of the South Dakota border.

The earthen dam was constructed in 1970 by the United States Army Corps of Engineers to impound the North Fork of the Grand River for flood control, fish and wildlife preservation, recreation, and municipal and industrial water supply.  The dam is owned and operated by the Corps of Engineers, with a height of 79 feet and a length of 5730 at its crest.

The reservoir it creates, Bowman-Haley Lake, has a water surface of 2.7 square miles and a maximum capacity of 171,838 acre-feet, although its normal storage level of 19,780 acre-feet is much smaller.

See also 
List of dams in the Missouri River watershed
List of dams and reservoirs in North Dakota
Shadehill Dam
U.S. Army Corps of Engineers

References 

Dams in North Dakota
Reservoirs in North Dakota
United States Army Corps of Engineers dams
Buildings and structures in Bowman County, North Dakota
Earth-filled dams
Dams completed in 1970
Bodies of water of Bowman County, North Dakota